Khuda Mera Bhi Hai is a Pakistani drama serial that aired on ARY Digital from 22 October 2016 to 10 April 2017. The serial is written by Asma Nabeel, directed by Shahid Shafaat and produced by Sana Shahnawaz. The title soundtrack has been composed and sung by Waqar Ali. It stars Ayesha Khan, Syed Jibran, Furqan Qureshi, Saba Hamid, Alyy Khan, Mehmood Aslam, Hira Tareen and others.

Overview
The drama revolves around Mahagul (played by Ayesha Khan), a mother who gives birth to an intersex child named Noor (played by Furqan Qureshi), and the resulting challenges she faces in her family and society – where acceptance of the third gender remains a taboo. Noor's father, Zain (played by Syed Jibran) refuses to accept the baby and separates from his mother.

Mahagul is a conscientious, strong woman who envisions equal opportunities and fair treatment for her child like any other normal being. She provides him a privileged upbringing and education while challenging societal norms. She is joined in her mission by Noor's tutor Mikaeel (played by Alyy Khan), who becomes his caretaker and treats him like his own son. Mikaeel also develops feelings for Mahagul.

The serial sheds light on the stereotypes, gender discrimination and marginalisation that intersex people face within Pakistani society, and their identity crisis.

Cast
 Ayesha Khan as Mahagul, the mother of an intersex  child named Noor
 Syed Jibran as Zain, Mahagul's divorced husband and father of Noor
 Furqan Qureshi  as Noor, the intersex character and protagonist
 Saba Hamid as Savera, Mahagul's mother and the leader of an NGO
 Alyy Khan as Mikaeel, Noor's tutor and caretaker
 Hira Tareen as Kashmala, Zain's second wife
 Mehmood Aslam as Hassan, Zain's father
 Irsa Ghazal as Arshi, Zain's mother
 Imran Ashraf as Zaahir, Zain's younger brother and Noor's paternal uncle
 Mariam Saleem as Sanam, Mahagul's best friend and Zaahir's love interest
 Tabbasum Arif as Hina, Sanam's mother

Reception

Critical reception 
The serial has received critical acclaim for its bold story line, and the "important questions" it raises regarding communal attitudes towards transgender people in Pakistan. Mahwash Badar of The Express Tribune called it a "game changer", while praising the themes touched by the drama such as "domestic abuse, how divorce is considered taboo, social pressures, and most importantly, the rights of transgender people and intersex individuals in the Pakistani society." While reviewing negatively, The News commented that the series lacked the depth and sensitivity required to deal with the subject.

References

2016 Pakistani television series debuts
ARY Digital original programming
Pakistani drama television series
Pakistani LGBT-related television shows
Television shows set in Karachi
Urdu-language television shows
2017 Pakistani television series endings